Ditrigona pomenaria is a moth in the family Drepanidae. It was described by Oberthür in 1923. It is found in China.

The wingspan is about 21 mm. The fore- and hindwings are white and highly lustrous. The forewings with the fasciae pale brownish grey. There are broad sub-basal, antemedial, double postmedial and weakly marked narrow subterminal fasciae. The hindwings are as the forewings.

References

Moths described in 1923
Drepaninae
Moths of Asia
Taxa named by Charles Oberthür